Nikolai Yakovlevich Marr (Nikolay Yakovlevich Marr; , Nikoloz Iak'obis dze Mari;  — 20 December 1934) was a Georgian-born historian and linguist who gained a reputation as a scholar of the Caucasus during the 1910s before embarking on his "Japhetic theory" on the origin of language (from 1924), now considered as pseudo-scientific, and related speculative linguistic hypotheses.

Marr's hypotheses were used as a rationale in the campaign during the 1920–30s in the Soviet Union of introduction of Latin alphabets for smaller ethnicities of the country. In 1950, the "Japhetic theory" fell from official favour, with Joseph Stalin denouncing it as anti-Marxist.

Biography
His father, James Montague Marr (1793–1874), was an Englishman of Scottish descent, had originally moved to the Caucasus in 1822 to work as a trader, before moving into horticulture and worked with the Gurieli family of Guria. His mother was a young Georgian woman (Agrafina Magularia). Marr's parents spoke different languages (James spoke English and Agrafina spoke the Gurian dialect of Georgian), and thus could hardly understand each other. When Marr was 8 his father died, leaving the family in difficult circumstances.

In 1874 Marr was accepted into a Kutaisi boarding school, after his mother successfully secured funding from the local authorities for him. While a good student, Marr was nearly expelled as he was often in conflict with the school administration. He entered  at St Petersburg University in 1884, where he specialized in Caucasian languages, and simultaneously studied Arabic, Persian, Turkish, Hebrew, Sanskrit, Syriac, among others. Working under , the head of the department, Marr mainly worked with manuscripts. He completed his master's degree in 1899, with his thesis titled The Collection of the Parables of Vardan.

After graduating Marr taught at the university beginning in 1891, becoming dean of the Oriental faculty in 1911 and member of the Russian Academy of Sciences in 1912. Between 1904 and 1917 he undertook yearly excavations at the ancient Armenian capital of Ani.

After a visit to Turkey in 1933 Marr developed influenza, followed several months later by a stroke. He died from complications of these ailments in Leningrad on 20 December 1934.

Japhetic theory

Marr gained recognition with his Japhetic theory, postulating the common origin of Caucasian, Semitic-Hamitic, and Basque languages. In 1924, he went even further and proclaimed that all the languages of the world descended from a single proto-language which had consisted of four "diffused exclamations": sal, ber, yon, rosh. Although the languages undergo certain stages of development, his method of linguistic paleontology claims to make it possible to discern elements of primordial exclamations in any given language. One of his followers was Valerian Borisovich Aptekar, and one of his opponents was Arnold Chikobava.

In 1950 Marr's theories were criticized in a discussion in Pravda, culminating in a June 20, 1950 article by Stalin, "Marxism and Problems of Linguistics". After that point Marr's theories were largely abandoned by Soviet linguists, and an emphasis on Russian language research was promoted instead.

Publications
Selected works:

References

Bibliography

 
 
 
 
 
 
 
 
 
 
 

1864 births
1934 deaths
20th-century linguists
Archaeologists from the Russian Empire
Armenian studies scholars
Burials at Kazachye Cemetery
Deaths from influenza
Full Members of the Russian Academy of Sciences (1917–1925)
Full members of the Saint Petersburg Academy of Sciences
Full Members of the USSR Academy of Sciences
Georgian people of Scottish descent
20th-century historians from Georgia (country)
Linguists from Georgia (country)
Linguists from the Soviet Union
Linguists of Caucasian languages
Linguists of Kartvelian languages
Paleolinguists
People from Kutaisi
People from Kutais Governorate
Recipients of the Order of Lenin
19th-century historians from Georgia (country)